Copper bromide can refer to:
Copper(I) bromide, CuBr
Copper(II) bromide, CuBr2